Lyman Trumbull (October 12, 1813 – June 25, 1896) was a lawyer, judge, and United States Senator from Illinois and the co-author of the Thirteenth Amendment to the United States Constitution.

Born in Colchester, Connecticut, Trumbull established a law practice in Greenville, Georgia, before moving to Alton, Illinois, in 1837. He served as the Illinois Secretary of State from 1841 to 1843 and as a justice of the Illinois Supreme Court from 1848 to 1853. He was elected to the Senate in 1855 and became a member of the Republican Party. As chairman of the Senate Judiciary Committee from 1861 to 1873, he co-wrote the Thirteenth Amendment, which abolished slavery in the United States.

In the 1868 impeachment trial of President Andrew Johnson, Trumbull voted to acquit Johnson despite heavy pressure from other Republican senators. He was a candidate for the presidential nomination at the 1872 Liberal Republican convention but the fledgling party nominated Horace Greeley instead. Trumbull left the Senate in 1873 to establish a legal practice in Chicago. Before his death in 1896, he became a member of the Populist Party and represented Eugene V. Debs before the Supreme Court of the United States.

Education and early career
Trumbull was born in Colchester, Connecticut, the grandson of the historian Benjamin Trumbull.  After graduating from Bacon Academy, he taught school from 1829 to 1833.

At 20, he was hired as head of an academy in Georgia. He studied (read the law) as a legal apprentice, and was admitted to the bar in Georgia. He practiced law in Greenville, Georgia until 1837, when he moved west to Alton, Illinois.  His house in Alton, the Lyman Trumbull House, is a National Historic Monument.

Elected office
By 1840, Trumbull was elected to the Illinois House of Representatives. He was appointed as Illinois Secretary of State, serving from 1841 to 1843.  In 1848, he was appointed as a justice of the Supreme Court of Illinois, serving until 1853.

Although elected to the United States House of Representatives in 1854, he was elected by the state legislature to serve in the United States Senate before he could take his seat. He served for nearly two decades, from 1855 through 1873. During this time, he claimed party affiliations with the Democrats, the Republicans, the Liberal Republicans, and finally the Democrats again.

On August 7, 1858, Trumbull delivered a speech in Chicago stating "We, the Republican Party, are the white man's party, we are for free white men and for making white labor respectable and honorable, which it can never be when negro slave labor is brought into competition with it".

On December 16, 1861, Trumbull asked the Senate to consider his resolution:

Senator James Dixon said of the resolution that "it seems to me calculated to produce nothing but mischief."

As chairman of the Judiciary Committee (1861–1872), he co-wrote the Thirteenth Amendment, which prohibited slavery in the United States other than its use as punishment for crimes of which the party had been convicted; this became the sentence to "time at hard labor" that became assignable for certain crimes. It was also the constitutional loophole by which southern states abused convict lease labor, a practice lasting into the twentieth century.

Johnson impeachment trial

During President Andrew Johnson's impeachment trial, Trumbull and six other Republican senators were disturbed by their belief that Thaddeus Stevens and Benjamin Wade and those of similar position had manipulated the proceedings against Johnson in order to give a one-sided presentation of the evidence. Trumbull, in particular, noted:

Once set the example of impeaching a President for what, when the excitement of the hour shall have subsided, will be regarded as insufficient causes, as several of those now alleged against the President were decided to be by the House of Representatives only a few months since, and no future President will be safe who happens to differ with a majority of the House and two-thirds of the Senate on any measure deemed by them important, particularly if of a political character. Blinded by partisan zeal, with such an example before them, they will not scruple to remove out of the way any obstacle to the accomplishment of their purposes, and what then becomes of the checks and balances of the Constitution, so carefully devised and so vital to its perpetuity? They are all gone.
All seven senators, resisting the pressure imposed on them, broke party ranks and defied public opinion, voting for acquittal, although they knew their decision would be unpopular. In addition, they were joined by three other Republican senators (James Dixon, James Rood Doolittle, Daniel Sheldon Norton) and all nine Democrats in voting against conviction. None of the Republicans who voted against conviction were reelected. After the trial, Congressman Benjamin Butler of Massachusetts conducted hearings in the House on widespread reports that Republican senators had been bribed to vote for Johnson's acquittal. Butler's hearings and subsequent inquiries revealed evidence that some acquittal votes were acquired by promises of patronage jobs and cash cards.

Yellowstone

During the December 1871 congressional debate on the creation of Yellowstone National Park, Senator Trumbull, whose son Walter Trumbull was a member of the Washburn-Langford-Doane Expedition to Yellowstone in 1870, spoke in favor of the park concept:

Here is a region of the country away up in the Rocky Mountains, where there are the most wonderful geysers on the face of the earth; a country that is not likely ever to be inhabited for the purpose of agriculture; but it is possible that some person may go there and plant himself right across the only path that leads to the wonders, and charge every man that passes along between the gorges of these mountains a fee of a dollar or five dollars. He may place an obstruction there and toll may be gathered from every person who goes to see these wonders of creation.

Later career

After leaving the Senate in 1873, Trumbull set up a law practice in Chicago. He worked in private practice except for a brief period when he ran an unsuccessful campaign for governor (as a Democrat) in 1880. In January 1883, Trumbull was given a seat of honor at the dedication of the Pullman Arcade Theatre in George Pullman's company town.

He became a Populist in 1894. According to Almont Lindsey's 1942 book, The Pullman Strike, Trumbull took part in defending Eugene Debs and other labor leaders of the American Railway Union, who had been convicted for violating a federal court injunction during the 1894 Pullman railroad strike. Trumbull was part of the three-member legal team, which included Clarence Darrow, when their habeas corpus case In re Debs was heard by the US Supreme Court in 1895.

Trumbull died at his home in Chicago on June 25, 1896, and was buried at Oak Woods Cemetery.

Memorials

During his explorations in the west John Wesley Powell named Mt. Trumbull (and now the Mt. Trumbull Wilderness) in northwestern Arizona after the Senator. The Lyman Trumbull House is a National Historic Landmark. Trumbull has a street named after him in the city of Chicago; Lyman Trumbull Elementary School in Chicago was named after the Senator. Trumbull Park and adjacent Trumbull Park Homes in Chicago are named after the Senator.

See also
 List of American politicians who switched parties in office
 List of members-elect of the United States House of Representatives who never took their seats

References

Further reading
 White, Horace.The Life of Lyman Trumbull, Boston: Houghton Mifflin, 1913.
 Remarks of Hon. Lyman Trumbull, of Illinois, on seizure of arsenals at Harper's Ferry, Va., and Liberty, Mo., and in vindication of the Republican party and its creed, in response to Senators Chesnut, Yulee, Saulsbury, Clay and Pugh. Delivered in the United States Senate December, 6, 7, and 8 1859
 Speech of Hon. Lyman Trumbull, of Illinois, on introducing a bill to confiscate the property of rebels and free their slaves : delivered in the Senate of the United States, December 5, 1861 
 Speech of Hon. Lyman Trumbull, of Illinois, on amending the Constitution to prohibit slavery. Delivered in the Senate of the United States, March 28, 1864 
 Speech of Hon. Lyman Trumbull, of Illinois, on the Freedmen's bureau--veto message; delivered in the Senate of the United States, February 20, 1866

External links

Trumbull at OurCampaigns.com

|-

|-

|-

|-

1813 births
1896 deaths
19th-century American lawyers
19th-century American judges
Bacon Academy alumni
Democratic Party United States senators from Illinois
Georgia (U.S. state) lawyers
Illinois Democrats
Illinois Liberal Republicans
Illinois Populists
Illinois Republicans
Justices of the Illinois Supreme Court
Lawyers from Chicago
Liberal Republican Party United States senators
Members of the Illinois House of Representatives
Moderate Republicans (Reconstruction era)
People from Belleville, Illinois
People from Colchester, Connecticut
People of the Reconstruction Era
People of Illinois in the American Civil War
Republican Party United States senators from Illinois
Secretaries of State of Illinois
Union (American Civil War) political leaders